Tooth and Nail is a 1992 crime novel by Ian Rankin, originally entitled Wolfman. It is the third of the Inspector Rebus novels.

Plot summary

Rebus is drafted in by Scotland Yard to help track down a cannibalistic serial killer called the Wolfman, whose first victim was found in the East End of London's lonely Wolf Street. His London colleague, George Flight, isn't happy at what he sees as interference, and Rebus encounters racial prejudice as well as the usual dangers of trying to catch a vicious killer.

When Rebus is offered a psychological profile of the Wolfman by an attractive woman, it seems too good an opportunity to miss.

Connections to other Rankin books

 Journalist Jim Stevens from Knots and Crosses and non-Rebus book Watchman makes a cameo appearance, again basing off his status quo in Watchman.
 Rebus remembers the line "There are clues everywhere" at one point, a reference to the taunting messages he receives  in Knots and Crosses.
 Rebus briefly thinks "don't talk to me about Hyde", a reference to the events of Hide and Seek.
 Morris Gerald Cafferty makes his first appearance, in the background as a gangster Rebus has to give evidence against.

Writing Tooth and Nail

In the Exile on Princes Street foreword to Rebus: The Early Years, Rankin says he was living in London at the time of writing and didn't enjoy it, so "I brought Rebus to London so he could suffer, too". The original title was Wolfman but Rankin's American edition editor came up with the title Tooth and Nail, which Rankin "liked better" as it kept the early title sequence ([something] & [something]) going.

References

1992 British novels
Inspector Rebus novels
Novels set in London
Century (imprint) books